Emydocephalus ijimae, also called Ijima's sea snake and turtleheaded sea snake, is a species of snake in the family Elapidae. The species occurs in East Asia, in the shallow coastal waters of the Northwest Pacific Ocean. E. ijimae feed exclusively on the eggs of coral reef fishes, which makes them an important predator for maintaining a healthy coral reef ecosystem.

Etymology
The specific name, ijimae, is in honor of Japanese zoologist Isao Ijima (1861–1921).

Geographic range
E. ijimae is found on the coasts of China, Japan (including the Ryukyu Islands), and Taiwan.

Sex and growth 
E. ijimae exhibit sexual size dimorphism with males reaching a snout–vent length (SVL) typically less than 750 mm and females sometimes exceeding 800 mm. Females also have a larger body weight ranging from 170 to 600 g compared to the male that weighs in at 70 to 350 g. The female BW also experiences greater fluctuations than males. Adult males typically see an increase in BW from early spring to late summer and females occasionally undergo a rapid BW decrease from late autumn to early spring followed by a steady weight regain.

SVL in newborn E. ilijmae is between 266 mm and 342 mm. Neonate males have been reported to grow 0.27 mm/day while neonate females grow 0.36 mm/day. The snakes reach maturity around the same age. Between 19 and 28 months for males and 19-26 months for females.

Reproduction
E. ijimae is viviparous. Neonates begin reproductive activity in the second or third summer and third spring after birth. Studies have suggested that E. ijimae are income breeders that rely on temporal energy intake to produce offspring.

References

Further reading
Stejneger L (1898). "On a Collection of Batrachians and Reptiles from Formosa and Adjacent Islands". J. College Sci., Imperial Univ. Tokyo 12 (3): 215–225. (Emydocephalus ijimae, new species, p. 223).
Stejneger L (1907). Herpetology of Japan and Adjacent Territory. United States National Museum Bulletin 58. Washington, District of Columbia: Smithsonian Institution. xx + 577 pp. (Emydocephalus ijimae, pp. 413–417, Figures 334–337).

External links
 

ijimae
Snakes of China
Reptiles of Japan
Reptiles of Taiwan
Fauna of the Ryukyu Islands
Fauna of the Pacific Ocean
Reptiles described in 1898
Taxa named by Leonhard Stejneger